KHAD (104.5 FM) is an American radio station licensed to serve the community of Upton, Wyoming. The station, established in 2009, is currently owned by The Casper Radio Group, Inc.

Programming
KHAD previously broadcast an active rock music format.  As of August 24, 2021, it appears to be carrying a placeholder format of automated, commercial-free classic hits interrupted by a station ID twice an hour.

History
The station received its original construction permit from the Federal Communications Commission on June 28, 2006, and was assigned the call letters KRUG by the FCC on October 30, 2006.  The station, still under construction, flipped its call sign to KHAD on April 2, 2009, in a swap with a sister station in Mills, Wyoming, now known as KZQL.

In May 2009, White Park Broadcasting, Inc., reached an agreement to sell KHAD to The Casper Radio Group, Inc.  The deal was approved by the FCC on June 5, 2009, and the transaction was consummated the same day.  KHAD received its license to cover from the FCC on June 8, 2009.

Originally, the call letters "KHAD" had been assigned to an AM station in De Soto, Missouri, in 1968.  This station closed in the late 1990s.

References

External links

HAD
Active rock radio stations in the United States
Radio stations established in 2009
2009 establishments in Wyoming